Parisian Life is a 1936 French English-language musical film directed by Robert Siodmak and starring Max Dearly, Conchita Montenegro, Neil Hamilton.

Plot
A rich Brazilian, Mendoza, visited Paris in 1900 and was romantically involved with the star of Offenbach's "La Vie Parisienne" which was playing at the time. Thirty five years later, he returns with his son and granddaughter, who is engaged to a young Frenchman.

Cast
 Max Dearly as Don Ramiro de Mendoza
 Conchita Montenegro as Helenita
 Neil Hamilton as Jaques
 Tyrell Davis as Georges
 Eva Moore as Liane
 Carol Goodner as Simone
 Austin Trevor as Don Joao
 Germaine Sablon as The Singer

Production

Development
It is based on the operetta La Vie parisienne  by Ludovic Halévy, Henri Meilhac and Jacques Offenbach. It is the English-language version of the 1936 French film La Vie Parisienne. Such multi-language versions were common during the early years of sound.

References

1936 films
1936 musical films
French multilingual films
Films directed by Robert Siodmak
Films based on operettas
French black-and-white films
English-language French films
Jacques Offenbach
French musical films
1936 multilingual films
1930s French films